For All My Sisters is the sixth studio album by English band The Cribs. It was released in Germany on 20 March 2015, in the UK on 23 March and in North America on 24 March. The Cribs announced the album title and track-listing on 19 January 2015, along with the teaser track "An Ivory Hand". The album was recorded in New York with producer Ric Ocasek - the last album he produced before his death in 2019. This is the first Cribs album to not be released by their longtime label Wichita Recordings, as the group signed a deal with Sony RED UK to release recordings under their own label, Sonic Blew.

The first single released from the album was "Burning For No One", on 23 March 2015.

The album entered the UK midweek album chart at number 7 eventually charting at number 9 when the UK Albums Chart was announced on Sunday 29 March 2015. For All My Sisters is The Cribs' third top 10 album in a row.

Accolades

Charts

Track listing

Personnel
Gary Jarman – vocals, bass, guitar
Ryan Jarman – vocals, guitar
Ross Jarman – drums, percussion
Ric Ocasek – Record producer
Sam Bell – co-Record producer
Kabir Hermon – assistant engineer
John O'Mahony – mixing engineer
James Sandom – manager
Ali Tant – product manager
Pieter M. van Hattem – photographer
Nick Scott – Art Direction

References

2015 albums
The Cribs albums
Albums produced by Ric Ocasek